Nathan Cutler (May 29, 1775 – June 8, 1861) was an American politician in Massachusetts and Maine.  He was a Democrat.

Cutler graduated from Dartmouth College in 1798, and was preceptor at Middlebury Academy for one year thereafter. He then studied law with Judge Chipman of Vermont and later in Worcester, Massachusetts where he was admitted to the bar in 1801. For a time he practised in his native town before moving to Farmington, Maine in 1803 where he lived for the rest of his life. In 1812, he was appointed Judge of the Court of Common Pleas but declined to accept the office. He was several times a member of the Legislature of Massachusetts before the separation of the District of Maine. He was a delegate to the Maine Constitutional Convention in 1819 that framed the Constitution of the State of Maine, and subsequently became active in public life and politics in Maine. He was many times a member of the Legislature of Maine.  In 1828, he was elected to the Maine Senate, and served as Senate president.  When Governor Enoch Lincoln died on October 8, 1829, Cutler was sworn in as the seventh Governor, serving until the expiration of his Senate term on January 6, 1830.  Cutler was a presidential elector in 1832, and served in the Maine House of Representatives in 1844.

He was one of the incorporators of Farmington Academy and during his lifetime president of the board of trustees. He was deeply interested in classical studies, of which he was a lifelong student.

He married Hannah Moore of Warren, Massachusetts on September 10, 1804. They had nine children of whom seven survived to adulthood. Hannah died in 1835. He married Harriet Weld née Easterbrooks of Brunswick, Maine in 1856.

References

External links
 National Governors Association profile
 

1775 births
1861 deaths
Democratic Party members of the Maine House of Representatives
Presidents of the Maine Senate
Democratic Party Maine state senators
Democratic Party governors of Maine
Dartmouth College alumni
People from Farmington, Maine
19th-century American lawyers